This is a list of characters from the Guilty Gear fighting game series.

Creation and influences

Daisuke Ishiwatari has cited Kazushi Hagiwara's manga Bastard!!, and the fighting game Street Fighter II as influence to the Guilty Gear series. However, he noted that the majority of other fighting games were just recycling the character's same skins or style, and so he wanted every character "to be unique in their own way." Kazuhiko Shimamoto's characters were also noted as an inspiration for the male characters, with Ishiwatari saying they needed to be "chivalrous person-like characters", and citing Anji Mito "the most closest to this type". The female ones, on the other hand, have not followed a standard, with Ishiwatari only remarking that they needed to look like real women.

There are many musical references in the Guilty Gear series, including various characters' names and moves, which were inspired by rock and heavy metal bands like Queen, Guns N' Roses, and Metallica. For instance, the main character, Sol Badguy, was named after Queen's lead vocalist, Freddie Mercury. Both his real name, Frederick, and his last name were influenced by the singer, whose nickname was "Mr. Badguy".

Introduced in Guilty Gear

Sol Badguy

Sol Badguy is the protagonist of the Guilty Gear series.

In the series, he is a bounty hunter who has dedicated his life to the destruction of Gears, a race of magical bioweapons that plunged the world into a hundred-year war known as the Crusades.

Ky Kiske

 is the chief of the International Police Force. He was made head of the Sacred Order of Holy Knights at age 16 and under his leadership, they were able to bring an end to the century long Crusades against the Gears. He is dedicated to God and works to maintain peace after the Holy War. Although he morally sees only in black and white and not in shades of grey, and is easily manipulated by unseen workers from the Holy War, he is working to adjust. His dedication to law and order puts him at odds with the free-spirited Sol Badguy, his rival. He fights with the Thunderseal sword and with his lightning magic.

Axl Low
Voiced by (English): Alexander Gross (Guilty Gear Strive)
Voiced by (Japanese): Keiichi Nanba

 is a time traveller who comes from 20th-century England, over 150 years before the Guilty Gear storyline, before he was caught in a time slip that sent him into the future. In reality, Axl became a being similar to I-No with the ability to manipulate reality. Axl made attempts to return to his time and be reunited with his girlfriend, first participating in the Sacred Knights Tournament as he thought he could have his wish granted as the winner. He later tried to contact I-No upon realizing she can send him back to his time, only for Jack'O to reveal the truth of his powers and that he could erase their reality to return to his. After much deliberation, Axl finds the courage to use his powers to become someone Megumi could be proud of.

Baiken
Voiced by (English): Patty Mattson (Guilty Gear -STRIVE-)
Voiced by (Japanese): Satomi Kōrogi (Guilty Gear), Miho Sudo (Guilty Gear X), Chizu Yonemoto (Guilty Gear XX), Mayumi Asano (Guilty Gear Xrd – present)

 is among the few people born of Japanese descent. When she was young, her family was attacked by the Gears, a race of magical bioweapons that plunged the world into a hundred-year war known as the Crusades. After watching the death of her parents and losing her right arm and left eye, she swore revenge on the Gears creator, "That Man". For this end, she trained herself in the use of the katana. She has many hidden surprise weapons within the sleeve of her severed arm: a Japanese mace, a fireworks cannon, a bladed fan, a rope dart, a hook, a claw, and a spear. As of Xrd, she wears an eyepatch goggle on her scarred eye and was brought by May to visit Kum Haehyun. In Strive, it turns out that Baiken's actual target who she referred as "That Man" is not Asuka R. Kreutz, but his former teacher, Happy Chaos. Upon learning from Chipp and Anji that Chaos cannot be killed easily and fearing Delilah would endanger herself on a suicide attempt to avenger her late brother, Bedman, Baiken shifts to adopting Delilah, due to sharing similar situation of being lonely after losing the only family she had like hers.

Outside of the Guilty Gear series, Baiken appears as a playable character in the 2019 SNK fighting game Samurai Shodown.

Chipp Zanuff
Voiced by (English): Edward Bosco (Guilty Gear Xrd SIGN - present)
Voiced by (Japanese): Takuya Morito (Guilty Gear), Takeshi Miura (Guilty Gear X – XX), Yoshihisa Kawahara (Guilty Gear Xrd SIGN – present)

 was a youth who struggled to live life on the streets of America. Chipp was a drug trafficker that soon became a drug user. He found himself in a complicated situation that led to him fleeing from the Mafia. Chipp had become outnumbered and was almost dying, but his pursuers were dispatched by a man called . He offered Chipp into his care, and trained Chipp in the art of Ninjutsu. They lived peacefully together until an assassin syndicate ordered Tsuyoshi's killing. Chipp, in an attempt to pursue the culprits responsible, entered the second sacred order tournament in order to get him a lead in his travels. Sometime during the events of XX onward, Chipp founded a kingdom called East Chipp Kingdom in a once lawless southern part of Africa. During Ariels' descent to madness, he is the first to discover that she is possessed by Happy Chaos, the true mastermind who manipulated the events and used Asuka as a scapegoat for the cause he did not commit.

Faust

Justice 
Voiced by (Japanese): Takuya Moritou (Guilty Gear), Wakana Sakuraba (Guilty Gear XX), Kazue Fujita (Guilty Gear Xrd SIGN)

 is the original Command Class Gear, created by Asuka from Aria as a means to end war. Through Happy Chaos's influence, the Universal Will took over Justice in an attempt to manifest into the physical world using her and the population of Japan. Asuka was forced to override Justice and force her to annihilate Japan to stop this. The ordeal shattered Aria's mind - she forgot her past and began the century-long conflict known as the Crusades, only regaining her memories as Aria when Sol killed her. However, Justice's body ended up in the possession of the Conclave, who sought to revive her so they could use her power to reform humanity according to their vision. Justice's body was taken by Ariels for her plan to merge with Elphelt Valentine, a genetic copy of Aria, to create a "complete humanity". Jack'O Valentine, possessing the fragmented half of Aria's soul, took Elphelt's place and merged with Justice to completely restore Aria.

Kliff Undersn
Voiced by: Hatsuaki Takami (Guilty Gear), Shigeru Sakano (Guilty Gear XX)

A hero of the Crusades, having clashed with Justice multiple times, he became a great mentor to Ky Kiske and personally scouted Sol Badguy to join the Holy Order. He is the foster-father of Testament, whom he found as an orphan during the Crusades.

May 
Voiced by (English): Eden Riegel (Guilty Gear Xrd SIGN - present)
Voiced by (Japanese): Satomi Kōrogi

, the young, cute, and spunky first mate of the Jellyfish air pirates that is utterly dedicated to Johnny, the leader of the pirates and the man who raised her after she was orphaned. She entered the first tournament in order to bail Johnny out of prison, and fights in later tournaments for his benefit. She fights with a massive ship's anchor, which she is able to swing with ease. May is revealed to be one of the endangered citizens of Japan who are cursed by Universal Will with a seed that would transform them into living bombs bending to destroy the world. In Xrd, she begins to suffer an illness before being brought to Kum Haeyun for treatment. Thanks to the treatment, May has Information Flares in her which saves her from becoming an antimatter Gear.

Millia Rage

Potemkin 
Voiced by (English): Armen Taylor (Guilty Gear Strive)
Voiced by (Japanese): Hideyuki Anbe (Guilty Gear), Takashi Kondō (Guilty Gear X – present)

, a massive slave-soldier of Zepp, a floating continent controlled by a military dictatorship, Potemkin was forced into the first tournament by his superiors. However, during the tournament, the government of Zepp was overthrown in a revolt led by Gabriel, his mentor. Once Gabriel was made president of Zepp, Potemkin pledged his loyalty to the new government as a special agent. The mantle he wears was a slave collar used by his superiors to keep him in check. He decided to keep it as a memento of his past. From Xrd and onwards, he wears a Zepp Military Uniform and a masked helmet.

Testament
Voiced by (English): Kayleigh McKee (Guilty Gear -STRIVE-)
Voiced by (Japanese): Takami Akkun (Guilty Gear), Katsuaki Kobayashi (Guilty Gear X – XX), Yu Kobayashi (Guilty Gear -STRIVE-)

 was an orphan during the Crusades, and was adopted by Kliff Undersn. When they were old enough, they desired to become a soldier in the war against Gears, and was known in the Holy Orders as the Black Knight. The Post-War Administration Bureau found them frustrated as they became mentally depressed, and offered to transform them into a Gear. They accepted, though unlike most Gears they still retained their sense of self. However, Justice turned them against humanity, and they found themself on the opposite side of the war from which they started, causing them to become cynical with a regret after being freed from her mind control at the time of her death at the hands of Sol Badguy. While hiding from humanity, they acted as a guardian to Justice's daughter, Dizzy, when her Gear powers go awry and cause her to end up having a bounty on her head. That is until The Jellyfish Pirates adopted her, before she met and married Ky Kiske. They were not seen after Dizzy begins her relationship with Ky until they return being introduced to Dizzy and Ky's son, Sin, including Elphelt and Ramlethal Valentine in the ending of Strive many years later after Dizzy's name is cleared and is symbolized as hope and seen as a perfect queen who married to a noble-hearted human king like Ky. It also reveals between Xrd and Strive, where they were announced as the last Season 1 fighter of Strive that Testament now lives peacefully with Dizzy's adoptive human parents.

Zato-1 and Eddie
Voiced by (English): Matthew Mercer (Guilty Gear Xrd SIGN - present)
Voiced by (Japanese): Kaneto Shiozawa (Guilty Gear – X), Takehito Koyasu (Guilty Gear XX – present)

 was a Spanish member of the powerful Assassins Guild that allowed himself to become the host of a symbiotic creature named  in exchange for his sight. Because of this, Zato-1 was able to take control of his shadow, and use it as a weapon to gain great power. With this power, he made himself leader of the Assassins Guild. However, as his body weakened, Eddie was able to take control until Zato-1's death at the hands of Millia Rage. While his body was taken by Eddie from Guilty Gear XX onward, after the death of his voice actor Kaneto Shiozawa, Zato-1 was resurrected by the Conclave as part of their experiment and serving them until he is defeated by Faust. He later returns to the Assassins Guild and played a role in its reformation into a legit intelligence organization.

Introduced in Guilty Gear X

Anji Mito
Voiced by (English): Kae Min (Guilty Gear -STRIVE-)
Voiced by (Japanese): Toru Igarashi (Guilty Gear X – XX), Nobutoshi Canna (Guilty Gear -STRIVE-)

, real name unknown, is among the few people born of Japanese descent. Because of this, he is protected by the government since full-blooded Japanese are an endangered race. While there are those who accept this lifestyle, Anji does not—he compares acceptance of government to living in a zoo's cage. To regain his freedom, he escaped from his colony and pursued "That Man" for answers. He fights with a pair of hand-held fans called . It is implied that Anji stole the Zessen Wind Fans, which had been stored in the Japanese colony, before escaping. However, after Asuka turned himself in to the government and joined the world peace project in Strive, he is not "That Man" whom Anji refers to, it was the Gear Maker's former master, Happy Chaos, the true mastermind who had been possessing Ariels' body, and the one who both destroyed Baiken's village and used Asuka as a scapegoat for the cause.

Dizzy
Voiced by (Japanese): Kazue Fujita

 was abandoned by her mother Justice, and found as an infant roughly three years before the events in Guilty Gear X (her first appearance), by an old couple. However, the other villagers became afraid since Dizzy appeared to age from being an infant to her late teens in three years. This was compounded when she discovered, that she now had wings and a tail. Dizzy was now identified as a Gear—essentially, a living weapon of mass destruction, and a hundred-year war against Gears had just ended five years ago. Dizzy's foster parents hid her in a grove in the woods, but she was soon discovered and subjected to abuse at the hands of her captors. She quickly escaped, however, and the government issued a 500,000 World-Dollar bounty for her death. She was later taken in by Johnny and May, joining the Jellyfish Pirates. Dizzy had married Ky and they had a half Gear child named Sin. Dizzy made an NPC appearance in Guilty Gear Xrd -Sign- before again becoming playable in Guilty Gear Xrd -Revelator/Rev 2- as the result of a fan vote conducted by Arc System Works. Her father was confirmed to be in-fact none other than a bounty hunter prototype Gear Sol Badguy in the near end of Revelator. In the After Story of -Revelator/Rev 2-, the public finally symbolizes Dizzy as a symbol of hope, allowing her to restart her family life normally with Ky and Sin, as well as Ramlethal and Elphelt.

Jam Kuradoberi
Voiced by (English): Xanthe Huynh (River City Girls 2)
Voiced by (Japanese): Manami Komori (Guilty Gear X – XX), Rei Matsuzaki (Guilty Gear Xrd REVELATOR)

 is a master chef, and longs to create her own restaurant, but lacks the means to do so. She seems to have terrible luck in this endeavor even once she gets it off the ground. She's a fairly docile character, and also relatively unimportant during the beginning arcs of the storyline. However, during XX, Jam's ability to wield Ki becomes a very notable aspect. She can be described as a bit of a flirt, as she has hit on both Bridget and Ky in her story. Jam returns in Guilty Gear Xrd -Revelator-/Rev 2, where her restaurant was somehow destroyed for the third time, and became frustrated when she found out that Ky married to Dizzy, leading her to return to bounty hunting. After Rev 2, as shown in the ending of -Strive-, Jam is opens a fourth restaurant, where she is seen serving dishes for Kum Haeyun.

Johnny
Voiced by (Japanese): Norio Wakamoto

 is the captain of the airship May Ship and leader of the Jellyfish Pirates. His first appearance was in Guilty Gear as a non-playable character in May's ending, and he became a playable character in Guilty Gear X. Johnny is a compulsive womanizer; his entire crew, including May, is composed of young women, but when it comes to the protection of his crew, Johnny is a selfless acting man who will protect the lives of his crewmates as well as others if need be. He is protective of Dizzy, defending her from bounty hunters in Guilty Gear X and I-No's attack in Guilty Gear XX. He fights with a wood-handled Japanese sword and uses the Iaidō style of swordsmanship. Johnny made an NPC appearance again in Guilty Gear Xrd -Sign- before returning as playable in Guilty Gear Xrd -Revelator-.

Venom
Voiced by (Japanese): Mikio Yaeda (Guilty Gear X), Junichi Suwabe (Guilty Gear XX – present)

 is an orphan raised by the Assassin's Guild. Venom became an apprentice and the devoted right hand of Zato when he saved him from being executed by the Guild who were displeased by Venom's reluctance to kill. Once Millia began to hunt Zato and the parasite Eddie began taking more control, Venom began his quest to save his beloved master. He fights using a cue stick.

In -Revelator-/Rev 2 storyline, he met and befriended Robo Ky. After the storyline, he and a now bodyless Robo Ky are trying to readjust their new normal lives to repair the latter's body. Venom started out as a street vendor in a street alleyway before eventually being offered to open a bakery at a main shopping district. He has also done this to hide his identity and clear his assassination record.

Introduced in Guilty Gear Petit

Fanny
 is a strange nurse with an unusual connection to Dr. Baldhead who saves her life from a sickness. She fights her enemies in a similar same style to Dr. Baldhead, using a syringe that once belonged to her late mother. She appeared in the WonderSwan exclusive game Guilty Gear Petit and its sequel, Guilty Gear Petit 2. Her endings in both games show a big connection with Dr. Baldhead. In the first she is wondering why Dr. Baldhead disappeared; in the second she is saying goodbye because she knows she will never see him again.

Introduced in Guilty Gear X2 and updates

Bridget

I-No

Robo-Ky 
Voiced by: Takeshi Kusao (Guilty Gear X – XX), Yutaka Terada (Guilty Gear XX #Reload – XX Slash), Takumi Inoue (Guilty Gear XX Accent Core), Shigeru Chiba (Guilty Gear Xrd REVELATOR)

 is not simply one character, but in fact a line of robotic copies of Ky Kiske created by the shadowy Post War Administration Bureau. For some reason, Robo-Ky is often mistaken for the real Ky Kiske and vice versa during the game's story mode, even though his face is obviously metallic, his voice is higher-pitched and robotic, and he constantly blurts out *GIGIGI* or *BZZZT* noises during story sequences. A version of Robo-Ky, Robo-Ky Mk. II, whose moveset and technical parameters (like attack strength, defense, etc.) can be customized. Unlike the other Robo-Ky, Mk. II is built by and has loyalty to a mysterious scientist, not the Post-War Administration Bureau. Type is secret. As of Xrd, there's only one Robo-Ky left who survived its last appearance in XX Accent Core, the sentient first model unit, now as a con for hire and presumably homeless, until Venom hired the robot for some urgent emergencies. Sometimes later in After Story of Xrd Rev 2, Robo-Ky, now reduced to a head after sacrificing his body from his last battle against Bedman, is currently accompanying Venom, who wants to repay the robot's life to get more money and build a new body for him. Starting out as street vendors, then eventually open a bakery shop.

Slayer
Voiced by (Japanese): Iemasa Kayumi (Guilty Gear XX – Xrd SIGN), Takaya Hashi (Guilty Gear Xrd REVELATOR)

 is one of the few surviving species a nearly extinct ancient vampire race , who founded the Assassins Guild. He comes out of hiding when the Guild dives into chaos after Zato's disappearance. Cultured and debonair, Slayer enjoys haiku and spends his time with his wife Sharon, another immortal. He also has a personal connection with Gabriel, the president of Zepp, but seems to be acquainted with all of the movers and shakers of the Guilty Gear universe. He has the apparent motive of either observing the cast, or warning them of being targeted by the Post-War Administration Bureau. He personally knows "That Man"/Asuka and that character seems to hold him in high regard since he apologizes to Slayer. He was originally thought to be the only known surviving Nightless left, until another known as Nagoyuki is found alive and unearthed by Happy Chaos during -STRIVE-.

Zappa
Voiced by: Yūji Ueda

 is an unlucky young man, looking for a wife and writing in his diary about his new "disease" he has, which, from his point of view, consists of fainting and then waking up somewhere else, possibly with alarming wounds and fractures and no memory of how he got there. He seeks the doctor Faust to cure his paranormal ailment. When entering a battle, he is unconscious, with —his most powerful vengeful spirit—and the other ghosts having control of his actions. These ghosts consist of three giant centipedes, several will-o-wisp-like apparitions that manipulate a broken sword, three gray ghosts, a dark chihuahua-like dog, and a manifestation of lightning called Raou. As of Xrd, he is now "cured" from S-Ko's possession and now working for a paranormal investigation team at Illyria, under direction of the third king Daryl. By the time he reunites with Faust, Zappa soon stumbled upon what Faust had been reading, realizing the true masterminds behind manipulating the Conclave to attack humanity wants something to do on annihilating the Japanese for their extra ordinary Ki.

Introduced in Guilty Gear Isuka

A.B.A
Voiced by: Maki Takimoto

 is an artificial life-form, or homunculus, that was created by a scientist who lived within  mountain. However, before her birth, her creator was taken away by the military. A.B.A found herself alone within Frasco, and lived the first ten years of her life in total isolation until she managed to escape from Frasco. She began to collect keys to find relief from her sadness as they represented the opening of a bold new world and an escape from imprisonment. Eventually, she finds "Flament Nagel", an ancient war relic shaped like a key, and decides to keep it as her partner; whom she renamed . Her new goal was to acquire an artificial body for her newfound partner, whom she refers to as her spouse.

Leopaldon

 is the boss of Guilty Gear Isuka. He is a good man at heart who somehow manages to control a giant Gear, his faithful dog. A killer who shows absolutely no mercy, he is also a formidable beast.

Introduced in Guilty Gear Judgment

Judgment
Judgment was originally Raymond, a mad scientist working on the remote island of Isene and exploiting its inhabitants, trying to create a living weapon that would surpass even the Gears. He believed his work was the work of God. Raymond is devoured by Inus, a dark king of the underworld, who is subsequently killed. This allows Raymond to take control of Inus's power, transforming himself into Judgment. However, because Inus wished to remain dead, Judgment was subsequently consumed after being defeated.

Introduced in Guilty Gear 2: Overture

Dr. Paradigm
Voiced by (Japanese): Yuji Mikimoto

 is yet another of Guilty Gear 2: Overtures seven playable characters. He is one of the sealed Gears from the dimensional plane  during the era of the Genocide Gear Justice in the Crusades. This action was done so Justice could not control his mind using her Commander Gear abilities. Paradigm was later released when the 100-year war was over. Dr. Paradigm is a strongly skilled magician with a fairly large book of magics. He has a protective bubble around him which appears to be permanent. Due to Justice's daughter, Dizzy married to a noble first king of Illriya, Ky Kiske and has a son named Sin, Dr. Paradigm begin to work for the kingdom.

Izuna
Voiced by (Japanese): Toru Furusawa

 is another playable character who made his debut in Guilty Gear 2: Overture. Along with Dr. Paradigm and Valentine, Izuna also comes from the plane Backyard. Izuna is a Japanese fox spirit who himself was exiled to the Backyard. Unlike most spirits of his kind, Izuna gained a physical form through the power of his will. Izuna states that "There are more physical spirit demons like me, but were brainwashed by Valentine". He is a very skilled swordsman and has certain magical abilities. Izuna is also the one to teach Sol Badguy and Sin how to use the tactics of the Ghost and Master Ghost system in the game as well. Most fans believe Izuna's looks were taken off of Slayer, though this is not likely because various interviews with Daisuke Ishiwatari he exclaims that Izuna along with Valentine, Dr. Paradigm, and Sin are all new children (creations) of his.

Raven
Voiced by (Japanese): Shigeru Sakano (Guilty Gear XX), Hiroki Yasumoto (later games)

One of three servants to That Man. Little is known of him, but he does share some sort of connection with Axl Low which That Man describes as being "parallel existences" of each other. In the Guilty Gear novel "Lightning the Argent", Raven shows unusual battle prowess by essentially ignoring Sol's fire attacks, via regeneration, and beating Faust in an inter-dimensional battle. Raven is also present in several endings in Guilty Gear XX, in which one he is noted as the parallel existence of Axl Low. Raven appears as a boss character as well as was made a playable character via DLC in the game Guilty Gear 2: Overture for the Xbox 360. In Xrd second story of -Revelator, he is entrusted by That Man to carry on his mission in his absence, due to Bedman's interference while trying to stop Justice from destroying Earth, sending him into Nightmare Theater, though immune to the effect, but had him locked within isolated space, thus unable to exit real world, which That Man found it difficult to try. Raven's current tasks are to find Elphelt before she merges with Justice, and to seek out Jack-O, but first they need an assistance of Sol and his party since their objectives coincide. Raven has been announced as a playable character for Revelator in February 2016.

Sin Kiske
Voiced by (English): Yuri Lowenthal (Guilty Gear 2: Overture), Lucien Dodge (Guilty Gear Xrd SIGN - present)
Voiced by (Japanese): Issei Miyazaki

 is another of the six unique playable characters in Guilty Gear 2: Overture. He is son of the king of Illyuria, Ky Kiske, and the Maiden of the Grove, who was confirmed to be Dizzy. He was left in Sol Badguy's care because of the exploitable fact of his Gear cells may be known to the public. He bears grudges towards his father for neglecting him because of his duties as a king. Though Sin is at most five years old, he has the appearance of a tall boy in his late teens—making it hard to notice his rash, childlike behavior. Through Sol's training, Sin has grown into a very strong child. Sin is playable in the console versions of Guilty Gear Xrd, where he reconcile with his father, after his mother was freed from her seal, and eventually realize that Sol is related to him and his family, out of concern of his relation with Justice, Sin's grandmother whose identity was once Aria. With his mother's reputation is being cleared for her heroic actions against a possessed Ariels, Sin return home with his family to life peacefully, in addition of welcoming Elphelt and Ramlethal Valentines to the family. With Dizzy's previous outcast record is cleared, and being praised as a heroine and publicly as the first non-human leader, a queen, Sin becomes a knight, just like his father before him.

Valentine
Voiced by (Japanese): Chie Sawaguchi

 is one of six playable characters in Guilty Gear 2: Overture. Valentine is the exact copy of Aria, who is indeed one form of the genocide Gear Justice. Valentine's motives lead her to be defeated by Sol Badguy who was once in love with Aria. Her weapon of choice is a talking balloon named  with various amplified magic abilities. Valentine also has the power to brainwash enemies and turn them into her allies. Valentine's true form is a fake version of a Gear as yet her human looks resemble an unfinished Aria. Although she was destroyed, according to Raven and Asuka, there can be multiple Valentines, which eventually confirms only three known Valentines who first debut in Xrd.

Introduced in Guilty Gear Vastedge XT

Baldias
Voiced by (Japanese):

 is a member of the Conclave and one of the disciples of The Original (aka Happy Chaos), he fought Sol Badguy and Sin Kiske in their quest to upgrade Sol's Junkyard Dog Mk.II but ended up killed in battle.

Introduced in Guilty Gear Xrd and updates

Answer
Voiced by (Japanese): Tomokazu Seki

 is a chief officer of Chipp Zanuff. Originally, he was an average street punk before Chipp appeared in his home to clean up crime and help the downtrodden. Finding his preaching annoying, Answer had challenged Chipp to a duel, but lost. After this loss, he was swayed by Chipp's words and joined him in creating the East Chipp Kingdom. Answer is said to have a photographic memory, and he essentially assists Chipp as a 'human database'.

Bedman
Voiced by (English): Yuri Lowenthal
Voiced by (Japanese): Hikaru Midorikawa

 is a character who made his debut in Guilty Gear Xrd. He is smart, fast-talking and known to ramble, despite saying he does not like long conversations. He is a mind-reading assassin who in an induced coma like his sister Delilah due to their unique condition of their bodies unable to handle their greatly enhanced thought processes, creating a dream world to interact with others while using a weaponized roll-away bed to physically move about. Bedman is hired by Ariels to aid in her scheme with the promise that he would be able to retrieve his sister from her dream and they would thrive in the Absolute World, unaware that of what it actually is. After being forced to be awakened by Venom and Robo-Ky, the latter immune to his mind reading, Bedman succumbs to his condition and dies as he was about to kill Ariels upon learning she exploited him. Shortly after his death, an unknown person who appears to resemble Bedman, later revealed his recently awakened twin sister Delilah approaches his crumbling petrified corpse. As it turns out in Strive that Bedman's soul is still alive within his weaponized bed, and Delilah discovers that Happy Chaos is responsible for Ariels' corruption and her brother's eventual downfall prior to being separated by I-No. Thanks to being convinced by Sin to focus on Delilah's survival when her power is proved to be dangerous that would unintentionally destroy her surrounding in attempt to kill Chaos, Bedman sacrifice his soul to buy sometime for Ramlethal and Baiken to give a cure developed by Faust to Delilah.

Elphelt Valentine
Voiced by (English): Cassandra Morris
Voiced by (Japanese): Aya Suzaki

 is a character introduced in the console version of Guilty Gear Xrd as DLC. She is first portrayed as an ally, before and after capturing her sister, Ramlethal, and during a strike against Conclave and Justice. However, in the final chapters of Story Mode, once she exceeded her fighting limit too much, as Dr. Paradigm's warned her not to engage in combat while defending the Illriya castle, it is revealed her "true" objective was originally concealed from her own mind and didn't activate until after Justice's awakening. She was purposefully created not knowing her objective so that she could get close to Sol, Ky, and other major threats to "Mother." Even though Sol had much distrust for her in the beginning, he felt the need to save her from her programming as she started to remind him of Aria, not only in appearance, but personality as well. Before she self-destruct with no other way to stop it, she is stopped and saved by her sister Ramlethal as thanks for helping her awaken to the concept of emotions. She is then brought back to the Backyard where her fate is currently unknown. Apparently, she survived in -Revelator- storyline, but suddenly undergone a drastic change on her emotion and costume appearances. She is used by the mastermind, Ariels (or rather possessed by Happy Chaos) to be a vessel of Justice and destroyed humanity, but only to be saved Jack-O' by switching their places, and thus reviving Aria. Afterwards, she and Ramlethal lives in Kiske Estate.

Jack-O' Valentine
Voiced by (English): Nicole Tompkins
Voiced by (Japanese): Hiromi Igarashi

, more commonly known as simply Jack-O', is a playable character in Guilty Gear Xrd -Revelator- who uses Jack O'Lantern-themed weapons such as explosives . She is a Valentine that Asuka created from the remaining half of Aria's soul, created for the purpose to merge with Justice to restore her as Aria. Being incomplete made her slightly unstable and unable to function without her mask and toffee while developing a second childish persona. While Jack-O succeeds in her mission, she becomes the dominant persona of the completed Aria as she accompanies Sol as a bounty hunter. Despite already becoming a reincarnated Aria, Jack-O still has a conflict of being the original Aria's replacement, but her Aria-half insist she is better than she think she was, even Sol never once called Jack-O, "Aria", yet she already possess her pre-incarnate self's kindness completely from prior to becoming Justice as a primary reason for Sol to finally found peace and live.

Kum Haehyun
Voiced by: Hideaki Tezuka (Jeonryeok Kum)

 is the head of the Kum family and descendant of "Tuners" who can control the flow of energy. Kum Haehyun is a female, unknown to all, and normally rides inside of the humanoid artificial body Jeonryeok Kum ("Full Power Kum"). Only the Kum family are able to manipulate the flow of energy, but their presence in the world is scarce.

Leo Whitefang
Voiced by (English): Jamieson Price
Voiced by (Japanese): Tetsu Inada

 is a character who first appeared in the console version of Guilty Gear Xrd as DLC. One third of the triumvirate ruling Illyria. He's an old acquaintance of Ky's from the Crusades, during which they became friends and rivals. Once faced with the threat of annihilation on the frontlines, he proved his combat and leadership skills by leading his unit to survival. His raucous tone may give the impression that he lacks guile, but he's actually very discrete. He's proud and a sore loser, but he's also a hard worker, always willing to put in a little more effort. He created his very own dictionary, and privately enjoys adding people and incidents to the definitions of existing words. Leo is also an expert at surveillance. This is shown when he re-inspects which one is the real Happy Chaos, whom Sol, Asuka and Vernon thought to got rid of him off the White House airship Tir Na Nog.

Ramlethal Valentine
Voiced by (English): Erin Fitzgerald (Guilty Gear Xrd -SIGN-), Laura Stahl (Guilty Gear Strive)
Voiced by (Japanese): Megumi Han

 appears as a boss and later playable character in Guilty Gear Xrd. A lone girl who declared war on the entire world. She is a non-human life form born in the Backyard, which governs all of creation. Her relation to the Valentine who orchestrated the prior Baptisma 13 Incident (the Illyrian Invasion) is unknown. As an assassin of the Merciless Apocalypse, her objective is the extermination of the human race, and to that end she has formed an alliance of convenience with the United Nations Senate. Awakening the "Cradle" is her sole objective and mission. Her primary obstacle is Sol. However, her objective failed and she was easily captured because of Elphelt Valentine's sudden appearance. During her "imprisonment", she began to developed more emotions, instead of gloomy, sadistic and painless, under Sin and Elphelt's surveillance. When Bedman is sent by "Mother" to eliminate Ramlethal, he agrees to do so as he sees her as a thing, not a person. He is quite shocked, however, to see she has gained emotions and thus can't bring himself to kill a "little girl". When Elphelt went to help Leo to counter the Conclave and Justice's invasion on Illriya's castle, she exceeds her fighting limit. This turns her into a mindless puppet and she attacks her own allies after The Conclave and Justice are defeated. After Sol helps her re-assert her true consciousness, she decides to self-destruct to prevent herself from harming her allies, but Ramlethal deactivates her self-destruct sequence, in return for her kindness and introducing her to the concept of emotions. She is last seen in the company of Sol, Ky, and Sin as she watches her sister being summoned back into the Backyard. In -REVELATOR-, she is currently accompanying Sol and Sin as they search for Elphelt and Justice. After Jack-O switches places Elphelt and is reborn as Aria, she and Elphelt begin living at the Kiske Estate at the same time when Dizzy's public reputation is cleared and herself being praised as a perfect queen who married to a kind king like Ky. As of STRIVE, Ramlethal becomes a brigade commander at Illyria.

Introduced in Guilty Gear Strive

Giovanna
Voiced by (English): Lilimar Hernandez
Voiced by (Japanese): Mayumi Shintani

 is a Brazilian officer in the special operations unit that protects the President of the United States, accompanied by a wolf spirit called Rei. She is a very talented agent, yet still declined the privilege of earning a high ranked badge, due to hating its current new design made by president Vernon due to it being too cartoony. When Happy Chaos' invasion on the White House is about to begin, Giovanna was able to get there in time and took out most of Chaos' brainwashed agents and soldiers off-screen before the White House is revealed to be an airship Tir Na Nog. Giovanna has a need find a suitable good man, particularly the Illyrian second king, Leo Whitefang. Her distaste towards the special operations unit's cheesy high ranked badge design and her interest in Leo allows the second King to realize that the real Chaos was impersonating one of the new agents, Udos and was still on the airship, whereas the "Chaos" whom Sol, Vernon and Asuka got rid of was actually one of her high-ranked boss, Stryper.

Goldlewis Dickinson
Voiced by (English): Steven Barr
Voiced by (Japanese): Masafumi Kimura

 is an overweighted right hand-man of the 76th US President Colin Vernon E. Groubitz and the Secretary of Defense, who fights alongside an alien spirit filled coffin, code name "Area 51 - U.M.A.". Dickinson is personally invested in the ordeal with Asuka R. Kreutz, trying to protect his country from a possible threat of destruction. After Asuka turned himself in to the government and volunteered the World Peace G4 Summit, Dickinson was originally skeptical about Asuka supposedly advocating for peace, and jokes about whether "That Man" is actually two separate people. Unfortunately, his joke turns out to be the truth and he was unknowingly right all along. Asuka was held responsible for the initial firing, because of the person who exacerbated the conflict during the Crusades and framed Asuka as a scapegoat was actually his fallen master, Happy Chaos, the former Original, whom the public had also pinned under the title of "That Man" due to not knowing whom to blame for it.

He was initially one of the major NPC characters in the Guilty Gear Strives main storyline, prior to being released as the first downloadable playable character of Season 1. Dickinson also have a twin older brother who is a carefree sheriff in one of the American stages of Guilty Gear Xrd. Despite both sharing their love for eating fast foods (particularly Burgers), Goldlewis is dutiful, compared to his brother's carefree attitude.

 Happy Chaos 
Voiced by (English): Robbie Daymond
Voiced by (Japanese): Makoto Takahashi

 is an overreaching antagonist who took the name of secondary Jack'O Valentine that Asuka created as a contingency should Sol Badguy fail to defeat Ariels or I-No's power runs rampant, formally introduced in Guilty Gear Strive. He gathered disciples in Asuka R. Kreutz and the Conclave as he instructed them and the Sanctus Populi to safeguard the world, entrusting the artifacts he took from the Backyard to Asuka before departing into it to create I-No as a replacement to the Ultimate Will. But he mutates from absorbing half of I-No's power to prevent her from unraveling reality, losing his sense of morality while sealed within the Universal Will. Through possessing the Universal Will, the Original orchestrated numerous disasters and tragedies through the Universal Will with Asuka as his scapegoat. He later gains physical form when after I-No extracted him from Ariels, convincing I-No to steal Asuka's Tome of Origin to restore her power. Though he fused into I-No to restore her full power, he later reconstitutes himself following her demise.

He was later announced a third playable DLC of Strive Season 1 at Red Bull Kumite on 14 November, 2021, and was slated for November 30, 2021 release date.

Nagoriyuki
Voiced by (English): Evan Michael LeeVoiced by (Japanese): Taiten Kusunoki

 is a dark-skinned Nigerian Nightless vampire samurai and a war veteran of Crusades who debuted in Guilty Gear Strive. In battle, he wields an enormous katana paired with a large wakizashi and can drain opponents of their blood, like his fellow surviving Nightless, Slayer. In contrast to Slayer’s dandyism, Nagoiryuki is devoted to bushido, The material from his katanas is powerful and dangerous, which would slow those who have healing factors, no matter what species, including godlike beings. It is also implied that he knew Chipp's master, Tsuyoshi; as Chipp recognized some of his attacks, such as Gamma Blade. Having had been sealed and meditating beneath a building of Illriya town, he was forced to serve Happy Chaos once again on invading the U.S. White House airship Tir Na Nog, until he met Sol Badguy, allowing himself to be freed of Happy Chaos' control and aid Sol in return.

Non-playable characters

Aria Hale
Voiced by (English): Nicole Tompkins (Guilty Gear Strive)
Voiced by (Japanese): Chie Sawaguchi

 is Sol's lover and acquittance of That Man/Asuka, first referred to during Guilty Gear 2: Overture. Aria was said to be born with have an incurable illness called TP infection. Initially, Aria refuse to take Asuka's suggestion to go a cryosleep to keep the illness negated until the cure is found, but eventually agree with his suggestion when Sol volunteered to be transformed into a prototype Gear. While Aria's body is preserved, there are four known Valentines created, such as the original Valentine, Ramlethal, Elphelt and Jack-O, with the latter contains half of her soul and memories. It is also hinted that she could be Justice as when she was killed off, her final words were wishing the three of them could talk one last time. However, this was false, as Justice is revealed to be one of Aria's clones created from the cryogenic remains of her DNA and only retains some of her memories after her conversion into a Gear. While Aria is recreated after Jack-O switches places with Elphelt to merge with Justice in -Revelator-, she remains dormant while letting Jack'O become the dominant persona.

Ariels
Voiced by (English): Valerie Arem
Voiced by (Japanese): Junko Minagawa

Sanctus Maximus Populi Ariels is the current leader of the Sanctus Populi and the vessel of the Universal Will, an entity created by The Original to ensure eternal happiness for humans without harming them. But the Original made a critical error in not defining humans, with his creation reaching its own conclusion that the humanity it to meant to serve has yet to come into being and thus considers current "human" race as "redundancies" that must be exterminated. With the Sanctus Populi by its creator, the Universal Will made attempts to gain physical form in the real world through first the creation of Justice and then by possessing those who are named Sanctus Maximus Populi. As Ariels, she created the Valentines and recruited Bedman for her scheme to create an "Absolute World" while merging Justice with Elphelt to create the first her ideal humans. But the plan is foiled and Ariels is incarcerated, the Universal Will's actions later revealed to be manipulated and possessed by The Original, Happy Chaos as I-No extracted him from Ariels's body. She request Sol to stop both I-No and Chaos before they warped the universe. After I-No's demise, Ariels is fully recover back to her real good-self.

Asuka R. Kreutz
Voiced by (English): Yuri Lowenthal (Guilty Gear 2: Overture), Derek Stephen Prince (Guilty Gear XRD -SIGN- - present)
Voiced by (Japanese): Tomokazu Sugita

Asuka was an apprentice of The Original (now Happy Chaos) who was entrusted with the Tome of Origin, which he fused into his body, along with the Flame of Corruption and the Scales of Juno. He bestowed the two powers to Fredrick and Aria when saving the latter and honoring her request for Fredrick to continue living. However, he comes to regret it when Aria's transition into Justice and easily getting corrupted by Universal Will caused the Gear Wars. But in the Xrd storyline, aiding the protagonists in stopping the Conclave and then a possessed Ariels, Asuka revealed he only took the blame for the Universal Will's actions while creating Jack'O to complete Justice's restoration to Aria. Once Ariels is defeated, and Jack-O fully reincarnated as a fully human Aria, Asuka surrenders to the government so he can commence his World Peace Experiment with the intent of removing the Flame of Corruption from Sol, and leaving Earth to prevent the Tome of Origin from falling into the wrong hands. Although Asuka succeeds in removing Flame of Corruption from Sol, after he, Sol and U.S. president Vernon thought they got rid of Happy Chaos, their timing is at the worst peak when Chaos has escaped the ambush by swapping places with a brainwashed agent and expose the real Tome of Origin from Asuka's body to fuse himself with I-No, until Sol destroys her, with a help from Nagoriyuki, Axl and Ky. Following days, Asuka started a new normal life as a radio broadcaster in his own established studio, his dream job.

Colin Vernon E. Groubitz
Voiced by (English): Anthony Alabi (Guilty Gear Strive)
Voiced by (Japanese): Kiyoyuki Yanada (Guilty Gear Xrd - Guilty Gear -Strive)

A current/76th President of the United States in the current Guilty Gear timeline as of Xrd, with his predecessor Erica Bartholomew as his vice-president. He used to love football before entering the political world while keeping his football and his family photo at the White House as mementos. Sometimes in the past, Vernon lost his organic right arm and being given a mechanical one, which can be used as a weapon to defend himself from danger, such as being able to switch between combat mode or long-range. He plays an important role in Strive.

Daryl
Voiced by (English): Kaiji Tang
Voiced by (Japanese): Toshiki Izawa

The last of the three kings of the United Kingdoms of Illyria was the Third King. Unlike Ky and Leo, Daryl favors pragmatism, or in his own words; 'thinking objectively'. He is the least popular of the three kings as a result, but the people cannot deny his ability to rule, earning him the nickname King of Groundworks. He is a leader of a paranormal team where Zappa is a member.

When I-No made her move for the next terrorist attack after Ariels was defeated, Daryl takes care of Ky's position to represent Illyria's participation in World Peace G4 Summit at Washington, D.C. Daryl's participation at G4 directly saves Ky's Gear family, due to being originally meant to appear alongside Ky as the representatives of the Gear species shortly before I-No's next scheme happens. During Happy Chaos' invasion of the White House, Daryl remains calm with no fear. When U.S. president Vernon becomes more involved with Sol and Asuka, including Giovanna in stopping Chaos, Daryl was able to learn Chaos' origin and connection to I-No, and outsmart him to ensure the safety of himself and the other world's leader (safe for Vernon) and secretly implanted emergency magic communicator on Chaos' cold coffee to provide emergency backups. Daryl likes puddings and hot tea, and actually hates coffee and cold-temperature drinks.

At some point in the After Story of Xrd Rev 2, before the event of Strive, Daryl was both regrettably pushing one of his subordinates from overusing herself on finishing the biggest pudding in the world, and being one of the paranormal members (barring Zappa) for eating his subordinates' still incomplete, yet unexpectedly cursed giant dessert. At the time of Strive, Daryl and the rest of his subordinates who ate the incomplete pudding are freed from its penalty curse off-screen. By the end of Strive after Sol (now a human named Frederick) defeated Chaos-empowered I-No, Daryl's team celebrates a proper completion of the giant pudding they made together this time.

Delilah
Voiced by (English): Akane Fujikawa
Voiced by (Japanese): Jessica DiCicco

A younger sister of the late Bedman, and unwitting antagonist in the Another Story of Guilty Gear Strive, who briefly appeared as a cameo character in Guilty Gear Xrd sub-series. Due to her unstable physical condition, Delilah has been put into the Backyard while her brother had been working hard to find cures for her. Following Bedman’s sacrifice to weaken Happy Chaos-possessed Ariels before the heroes’ final battle against the fallen Sanctus Populi, Delilah returns to the real world shortly and consumed by vengeance. Delilah is also shares the same thing Baiken had, fueled by vengeance against Happy Chaos, the true culprit who goes by the name “That Man” since Crusades, instead of Asuka R. Kreutz. As Baiken learnt that Chaos cannot be killed easily, she have no choice to adopted Delilah at Anji and Chipp’s behalf, to keep her from endangering herself.

By the time Happy Chaos is freed by I-No and made their next moves during Strive event, Delilah decide to get her revenge on Chaos. However, her full power is too unstable to be used to destroy Chaos, which instead, turning her into a living bomb that would destroy half of locations she is in. Thankfully, Bedman, whose soul somehow reside in his weaponized bed manage to buy his time to keep Delilah’s power in check for short period, until Faust manage to administer a proper cure for her, at cost of the former’s soul and the latter’s physical condition, but allow Baiken and Ramlethal to save her, with the help from Sin and Jellyfish Pirates.

Erica Bartholomew
Voiced by (English): Sarah Anne Williams (Guilty Gear Strive)
Voiced by (Japanese): Masumi Tazawa

A former President of the United States turned vice-president in the current Guilty Gear timeline and from the novel, The Butterfly and Her Gale. An orphan, she is a child prodigy who became president at the age of 17. Chipp decided to become her bodyguard after the Assassin Syndicate tried to kill her. The reason for the attempt on her life is because the US had been under the influence and corruption of the Syndicate for many years. One of Erica's goals was to rid the US of its influence by forming an alliance with President Gabriel of Zepp since his nation was the most highly technological and powerful nation in the world. Despite attempts by the syndicate to frame each nation of an assassination attempt on their leaders, blackmailing the Senate, and kidnapping her guardian and caretaker of her orphanage, the alliance was finally made thanks to the help of Chipp. She is succeeded by Colin Vernon and demoted to vice-president as of Xrd.

Gabriel
Voiced by (English): Richard Epcar
Voiced by (Japanese): Takayuki Sugō

Potemkin's mentor and the current president of the Independent Airborne State of Zepp. Came to power leading the slave uprising in which he freed Potemkin. Though seldom seen in battle, when he does fight, his displayed feats indicate he's one of the most formidable characters in the series. Has a friendly rivalry with Slayer due to his aforementioned powers, being one of few people able to pose a challenge to Slayer. He is also a friend of the current U.S. president Vernon.

Inus
A dark king of the underworld, Inus is the fifth boss of Guilty Gear Judgment. Split into skeletal sections (two of them resembling skulls), he devours Raymond just before attacking the player character. After whatever character the player is controlling defeats Inus, he is subsequently killed, allowing Raymond to absorb his power to become Judgment. However, since Inus wished to remain dead, Judgment was consumed after he was defeated.

Jellyfish Air Pirates
 is Johnny's all-female air pirate crew, who travel with him on the May Ship. The members include eleven girls, one older woman, and a cat. There are several playable characters from the Jellyfish Pirates in the games; namely May, Dizzy and Johnny himself. Most of the members of the Jellyfish crew are orphaned girls adopted by Johnny, but there are exceptions; he took in Dizzy for her protection (and seclusion) from the larger world, and in one ending of Guilty Gear XX allows Bridget to live on the ship (although she is not officially a Jellyfish Pirate) when she has nowhere else to go.

The crew, whose names are derived from the English names of the twelve months of the year, includes, Janis, a black cat with a shaggy white forelock; Febby, a tall busty blonde who is the record-keeper; March, a pink-haired baby girl with a stuffed penguin; April, the ship's pilot; May, one of the crew's most capable fighters and the ship's namesake; June, the navigator; July, who is said to be the fourth strongest fighter on board, after Dizzy, Johnny, and May; Augus, a dark complexion fighter known to be fast; Sephy, a brown-haired and gentle-expressioned girl; Octy, the crew's lookout; Novel, the ship's mechanic who rides a large red mecha; Leap, an enormous white-haired woman who is the ship's cook; Dizzy, whom Johnny helped fake her death for her own protection.

Post-War Administration Bureau
The  (or P.W.A.B.''') is a fictional secret society in the Guilty Gear fighting game series, making its first appearance in Guilty Gear XX. It is the organization that created Robo-Ky, and changed Testament into a Gear.

The organization was founded during the war between humans and Gears; as its name implies, it was intended to manage the affairs of the human race once the war was over. However, the war's end saw no need for them, and it was supposed to have been disbanded. Instead, they merely retreated to the shadows.

The group demonstrably has access to relatively advanced technology, as it created Robo-Ky. However, its members can also use magic; an unidentified member of the group used a crystal ball to observe Jam Kuradoberi in one of her endings.

The purpose of the organization has apparently shifted entirely to maintaining its own power and influence, as well as its own secrecy, and its members are willing to go to any lengths to do so, evidently lacking any ethics in how they go about this. Its interest in each character seems focused on whether they should be manipulated, killed, captured, or studied, and each characters' Story Mode begins with the P.W.A.B.'s profile for that character, accompanied with a "risk rating" that apparently denotes how dangerous they are to the organization. Robo-Ky was created both to impersonate Ky Kiske and as an equalizer should they decide that direct confrontation is necessary. However, despite most of them destroyed, one of the Robo-Ky becomes a sentient being and survive the destruction.

Sometimes after Xrd, Millia reform the organization.

Solaria
A character from the novel Lightning the Argent. Solaria is a full-blooded Gear created by the Blackard Company. She was used by the company to awaken and control the world's dormant Gears as their weapons. She was later rescued by Ky Kiske where she now lives freely under the protection of the International Police Force.

Tsuyoshi
Chipp's Sensei and the man who changed his life. Tsuyoshi was a ninja master who saved Chipp when he was about to be killed by the mafia. It was his tutelage that changed Chipp from a drug addict to the man he is now. He was killed by the Assassin Syndicate before the events of Guilty Gear. The novel The Butterfly and her Gale reveals he was killed because he was an undercover agent of the International Police Force who infiltrated the Syndicate until they found out about his true identity.

Volf
A member of the Assassin Syndicate from the novel The Butterfly and her Gale. He is the man responsible for the death of Tsuyoshi. In the novel he & the Syndicate tries to prevent President Erica from forming the US/Zepp alliance in any way and even he himself was responsible for kidnapping her guardian. Ironically, his plans were thwarted by Tsuyoshi student, Chipp. For his failure to kill Erica, Chipp and stopping the alliance, he was killed by Venom personally.

Reception
The characters have often been noted as the best element of the Guilty Gear series. IGN said all the characters are very distinguishable and interesting, and remarked they "doesn't feel repetitive, even after dozens of hours of play", citing them as the reason that separates Guilty Gear from other fighting games. IGN also mentioned the character's play styles are "even more divergent" than their appearances. Game Informer stated "character complexity and unique visual design" have become hallmarks of Guilty Gear. GameSpy cited the characters as one of three reasons Guilty Gear X is "hands-down the best 2D fighting game" as of 2001, remarking that "[t]he difference in style for each character is profound". They also stated that it "has some of the coolest character designs ever seen in a game", and "one of the best casts of characters ever assembled in a fighter." GameSpot called them "unique character" and described their move-sets as "sometimes-bizarre". IGN called them "the best [...] outside Capcom/SNK", and GameSpot found they "truly awesome", noting their diversity "keeps Guilty Gear fresh". Allgame declared "superb is the only way to describe them", asserting they are all "pretty original". GamePro praised the characters' uniqueness as each have "distinct looks and strategies."

While some characters have been criticized for being "generic", "typical characters", and "unoriginal" the cast of characters in overall have also been generally described with adjectives such "bizarre", "quirk", and "crazy", with IGN noting that the series' cast makes "the biggest freak show" of Capcom, Darkstalkers, "look like a Saturday morning cartoon". Game Informer dubbed the cast "a roster of startling characters that would make Vincent Price whimper like a kitten." GameNOW'' even stated, "it makes me afraid to ponder the nature of the demons that have possessed the minds of the artists who created the characters ... They are among the wiliest and most violently flamboyant ever to grace a fighting game."

References

 
Guilty Gear

ja:GUILTY GEARシリーズ#登場人物